The 2018 Liga 3 Lampung is a qualifying round for the national round of 2018 Liga 3. Persilat, the winner of the 2017 Liga 3 Lampung are the defending champions. The competition will begin on August 2, 2018.

Group stage 
The 6 probable teams to compete are mentioned below.
This stage scheduled starts on 25 July 2018.

Group A

Group B

Knockout stage

References 

 

Lampung
Liga Nusantara
Liga 3 (Indonesia) seasons
2018 in Indonesian football leagues
3